The Network for the Promotion of Asian Cinema (NETPAC) is a worldwide organization of 29 member countries. It was created as the result of a conference on Asian cinema organized by Cinemaya, the Asian Film Quarterly, in New Delhi in 1990 at the instance and with the support of UNESCO, Paris.

Headquartered in Singapore, the NETPAC is a pan-Asian film cultural organization involving critics, filmmakers, festival organizers and curators, distributors and exhibitors, as well as film educators. It is considered a leading authority on Asian cinema. Since 1990, it has programmed Asian sections of international film festivals, introduced filmmakers from Asia to the world, brought out a compendium of the existing film infrastructure in different Asian countries, organized seminars and conferences and instituted an award for the Best Asian Film at festivals like Singapore, Busan, Jeonju, Kerala, Kazakhstan and Osian's Cinefan among those in Asia; Berlin, Locarno, Karlovy Vary, Rotterdam, Vesoul and others in Europe; at Brisbane in Australia; Hawaii in the US; Antalya in Turkey and Black Nights in Estonia.

The NETPAC Award is given at select international film festivals to promote Asian cinema by spotlighting exceptional films and discovering new talents. Among filmmakers who have won this award more than twice are Sri Lanka's Prasanna Vithanage (5 times); Kazakhstan's Adilkhan Yerzhanov (4 times); China's Wang Xiaoshuai (thrice) and Hao Jie (thrice); the Philippines' Lav Diaz (thrice) and Brillante Mendoza (thrice); Malaysia's Ho Yuhang (thrice); and South Korea's Kim Ki-duk (thrice).

NETPAC Award winners

1993
 Singapore International Film Festival
 Winner The Peach Blossom Land (Stan Lai, Taiwan)

1994
 Berlin International Film Festival
 Winner All Under the Moon  (Yoichi Sai, Japan)
 Special Mention Shackles  (Nansalmaagin Uranchimeg, Mongolia)
 Singapore International Film Festival
 Winner The Servile  (Adoor Gopalakrishnan, India)

1995
 Berlin International Film Festival
 Winner Undo  (Shunji Iwai, Japan)
 Winner Elephant Song  (Go Riju, Japan)
 International Film Festival Rotterdam
 Winner The Servile  (Adoor Gopalakrishnan, India)
 Singapore International Film Festival
 Winner A Borrowed Life  (Wu Nien-jen, Taiwan)
 Special Mention Mee Pok Man (Eric Khoo, Singapore)

1996
 Berlin International Film Festival
 Winner ...And the Moon Dances  (Garin Nugroho, Indonesia)
 Special Mention Heaven-6-Box  (Hiroyuki Oki, Japan)
 Busan International Film Festival
 Winner Three Friends (Yim Soon-rye, South Korea)
 International Film Festival Rotterdam
 Winner Heartbreak Island  (Hsu Hsiao-ming, Taiwan)
 Winner Nostalgia for Home Country (Nhat Minh Dang, Vietnam)
 Singapore International Film Festival
 Winner Good Men, Good Women  (Hou Hsiao-hsien, Taiwan)
 Special Mention It's a Long Way to the Sea (Jahnu Barua, North India)

1997
 Amiens International Film Festival
 Winner Somersault in a Coffin (Derviş Zaim, Turkey)
 Berlin International Film Festival
 Winner Focus (Satoshi Izaka, Japan)
 Busan International Film Festival
 Winner Bad Movie (Jang Sun-woo, South Korea)
 International Film Festival Rotterdam
 Winner 2 Duo (Nobuhiro Suwa, Japan)
 Singapore International Film Festival
 Winner 12 Storeys  (Eric Khoo, Singapore)
 Special Mention The Long Journey  (Lê Hoàng, Vietnam)

1998
 Amiens International Film Festival
 Winner Walls Within (Prasanna Vithanage, Sri Lanka)
 Berlin International Film Festival
 Winner The Pickpocket (Jia Zhangke, China)
 Busan International Film Festival
 Winner The Power of Kangwon Province (Hong Sang-soo, South Korea)
 Special Mention A Killing Story (Yeo Kyun-Dong, South Korea)
 International Film Festival Rotterdam
 Winner Dance of the Wind (Rajan Khosa, India)
 Special Mention Green Fish (Lee Chang-dong, South Korea)
 Singapore International Film Festival
 Winner In the Navel of the Sea  (Marilou Diaz-Abaya, the Philippines)
 Special Mention Hold You Tight  (Stanley Kwan, Hong Kong)
 Taiwan International Documentary Festival
 Winner Out for Love...Be Back Shortly (Dan Katzir, Israel)
 Special Mention Nadya's Village (Seiichi Motohashi, Japan)

1999
 Amiens International Film Festival
 Winner Death On A Full Moon Day (Prasanna Vithanage, Sri Lanka)
 Berlin International Film Festival
 Winner 2H (Ying Li, China)
 Winner Dil Se.. (Mani Ratnam, South India)
 Busan International Film Festival
 Winner The Bird Who Stops in the Air (Jeon Soo-il, South Korea)
 Special Mention The Uprising (Park Kwang-Su, South Korea)
 Cinemanila International Film Festival
 Winner Birth of A Butterfly (Mojtaba Raei, Iran)
 Special Mention Fetch A Pail of Water (Jeffrey Jeturian, the Philippines)
 Singapore International Film Festival
 Winner Connection by Fate (Wan Ren, Taiwan)
 Special Mention Beshkempir (Aktan Abdykalykov, Kyrgyzstan)
 Special Mention The Power of the Kangwon-du Province (Hong Sang-soo, South Korea)
 International Film Festival Rotterdam
 Winner The Servant's Shirt (Mani Kaul, North India)
 Yamagata International Documentary Film Festival
 Winner Shiro the White (Katsuyuki Hirano, Japan)
 Special Mention Annyong-Kimchi (Tetsuaki Matsue, Japan)
 Special Mention I Love (080) (Yang Li-chou, Taiwan)

2000
 Amiens International Film Festival
 Winner The Orphan of Anyang (Wang Chao, China)
 Berlin International Film Festival
 Winner The Lady of the House (Rituparno Ghosh, India)
 Winner Nabbie's Love (Yuji Nakae, Japan)
 Special Mention Making Sun-Dried Red Peppers (Jang Hee-Sun, South Korea)
 Busan International Film Festival
 Winner Chunhyang (Im Kwon-taek, South Korea)
 Dhaka International Film Festival
 Winner Padadaya (Linton Semage, Sri Lanka)
 Winner Saroja (Somaratne Dissanayake, Sri Lanka)
 Hawaii International Film Festival
 Winner Breaking the Silence (Zhou Sun, China)
 Special Mention Spinning Gasing (Teck Tan, Malaysia)
 International Film Festival Rotterdam
 Winner Nang Nak (Nonzee Nimibutr, Thailand)
 Winner Paper (Ding Jiancheng, China)
 Karlovy Vary International Film Festival
 Winner Yi Yi (Edward Yang, Taiwan)
 Special Mention Peppermint Candy (Lee Chang-dong, South Korea)
 Singapore International Film Festival
 Winner Darkness and Light (Chang Tso-chi, Taiwan)
 Winner So Close to Paradise (Wang Xiaoshuai, China)
 Taiwan International Documentary Festival
 Winner Alone (Dmitry Kabakov, Russia)
 Special Mention Happy Birthday, Mr. Mograbi (Avi Mograbi, Israel)
 Special Mention The Lost Kingdom (Lee Hsiang-Hsiu, Taiwan)
 Venice Film Festival
 Winner Platform (Jia Zhangke, China)
 Special Mention The Isle (Kim Ki-duk, South Korea)

2001
 Berlin International Film Festival
 Winner Smell of Camphor, Fragrance of Jasmine (Bahman Farmanara, Iran)
 Special Mention Wharf of Widows (Trong Ninh Luu, Vietnam)
 Brisbane International Film Festival
 Winner What Time Is It There? (Tsai Ming-liang, Taiwan)
 Special Mention The Wrestlers (Buddhadeb Dasgupta, India)
 Busan International Film Festival
 Winner Take Care of My Cat (Jeong Jae-eun, South Korea)
 Special Mention Bad Guy (Kim Ki-duk, South Korea)
 Special Mention Waikiki Brothers (Yim Soon-rye, South Korea)
 Cinefan Asian Film Festival
 Winner Demons (Mario O'Hara, the Philippines)
 Cinemanila International Film Festival
 Winner Batang West Side (Lav Diaz, the Philippines)
 Fajr International Film Festival
 Winner Going By (Iraj Karimi, Iran)
 Hawaii International Film Festival
 Winner Devils on the Doorstep (Jiang Wen, China)
 Special Mention The Day Toshi was Born (Hikaru Yoshikawa, Japan)
 International Film Festival Rotterdam
 Winner Daughters of the Sun (Maryam Shahriar, Iran)
 Special Mention The House of Guavas (Dang Nhat Minh, Vietnam)
 Jakarta International Film Festival
 Winner – Short Film The Greatest Day Dreamer (Liew Wai Ming, Singapore)
 Special Mention Wired (Chung Fa Yang, Taiwan)
 Karlovy Vary International Film Festival
 Winner Under the Skin of the City (Rakhshan Bani-Etemad, Iran)
 Special Mention Firefly Dreams (John Williams, Japan)
 Singapore International Film Festival
 Winner A Poet (Garin Nugroho, Indonesia)
 Special Mention This is My Moon (Asoka Handagama, Sri Lanka)
 Venice Film Festival
 Winner Secret Ballot (Babak Payami, Iran)
 Winner Quitting (Zhang Yang, China)
 Yamagata International Documentary Film Festival
 Winner My Migrant Soul (Yasmine Kabir, Bangladesh)
 Special Mention Pansy & Ivy (Kye Un-kyoung, South Korea)
 Special Mention Mysterious Object at Noon (Apichatpong Weerasethakul, Thailand)

2002
 Berlin International Film Festival
 Winner Chen Mo and Meiting (Liu Hao, China)
 Special Mention Fish and Elephant (Li Yu, China)
 Brisbane International Film Festival
 Winner Seafood (Zhu Wen, China)
 Special Mention Whispering Sands (Nan T. Achnas, Indonesia)
 Busan International Film Festival
 Winner Road Movie (Kim Insik, South Korea)
 Cinefan Asian Film Festival
 Winner Lan Yu (Stanley Kwan, Hong Kong)
 Cinemanila International Film Festival
 Winner Hollywood Hong Kong (Fruit Chan, Hong Kong)
 Special Mention Harmful Insect (Akihiko Shiota, Japan)
 Hawaii International Film Festival
 Winner Eyes of a Beauty (Hu Guan, China)
 International Film Festival Rotterdam
 Winner Wave (Hiroshi Okuhara, Japan)
 Special Mention Secret Ballot (Babak Payami, Iran)
 Locarno International Film Festival
 Winner Mr. & Mrs. Iyer (Aparna Sen, India)
 Special Mention Our Times (Rakhshan Bani-Etemad, Iran)
 Special Mention Obor Kalandia (Sobi al-Zobaidi, Palestine)
 Singapore International Film Festival
 Winner Eliana, Eliana (Riri Riza, Indonesia)
 Special Mention I-San Special (Mingmongkol Sonakul, Thailand)
 Taiwan International Documentary Festival
 Winner Sky-blue Hometown (Kim So-young, South Korea)

2003
 Bangkok International Film Festival
 Winner A Tale of a Naughty Girl (Buddhadeb Dasgupta, India)
 Berlin International Film Festival
 Winner Blessing Bell (Hiroyuki Tanaka, Japan)
 Special Mention Bird-Man Tale (Garin Nugroho, Indonesia)
 Brisbane International Film Festival
 Winner Oasis (Lee Chang-dong, South Korea)
 Special Mention Letters in the Wind (Ali Reza Aminal, Iran)
 Busan International Film Festival
 Winner Untold Scandal (E J-yong, South Korea)
 Cinefan Asian Film Festival
 Winner Drifters (Wang Xiaoshuai, China)
 Cinemanila International Film Festival
 Winner Divine Intervention (Elia Suleiman, Palestine)
 Special Mention Dekada '70 (Chito S. Rono, the Philippines)
 Karlovy Vary International Film Festival
 Winner The Coast Guard (Kim Ki-duk, South Korea)
 Locarno International Film Festival
 Winner Spring, Summer, Fall, Winter... and Spring (Kim Ki-duk, South Korea)
 Singapore International Film Festival
 Winner 15 – The Movie (Royston Tan, Singapore)
 Special Mention Unknown Pleasures (Jia Zhang-ke, China)
 Vesoul International Film Festival of Asian Cinema
 Winner Cry Woman (Liu Bingjian, China)

2004
 Berlin International Film Festival
 Winner South of the Clouds (Zhu Wen, China)
 Special Mention Final Solution (Rakesh Sharma, India)
 Brisbane International Film Festival
 Winner The River's End (Behrooz Afkhami, Iran)
 Busan International Film Festival
 Winner 3-Iron (Kim Ki-duk, South Korea and Japan)
 Special Mention So Cute (Kim Su-hyeon, South Korea)
 Cinemanila International Film Festival
 Winner Min (Ho Yuhang, Malaysia)
 Dhaka International Film Festival
 Winner Swaraaj – The Little Republic (Anwar Jamal, India)
 Hawaii International Film Festival
 Winner Peep 'TV' Show (Yutaka Tsuchiya, Japan)
 Honorable Mention Rewind (Hak-son Kim, South Korea)
 International Film Festival Rotterdam
 Winner The Missing (Lee Kang-sheng, Taiwan)
 Special Mention Uniform (Diao Yi'nan China)
 Locarno International Film Festival
 Winner Story Undone (Hassan Yektapanah, Iran)
 Winner The Hunter (Serik Aprymov, Kazakhstan)
 Osian's Cinefan Festival of Asian Cinema
 Winner Listener's Choice (Abdellatif Abdelhamid, Syria)
 Singapore International Film Festival
 Winner Ira Madiyama (Prasanna Vithanage, Sri Lanka)
 Tallinn Black Nights Film Festival
 Winner Cha no aji (Katsuhito Ishii, Japan)
 Special Mention Malenkije ljudi (Nariman Turebajev, Kasahstan, France)
 Vesoul International Film Festival of Asian Cinema
 Winner The First Letter (Abolfazl Jalili, Iran)

2005
 Berlin International Film Festival
 Winner This Charming Girl (Lee Yoon-ki, South Korea)
 Brisbane International Film Festival
 Winner Spying Cam (Hwang Chul-min, South Korea)
 Special Mention Boat out of Watermelon Rinds (Ahmet Ulucay, Turkey)
 Busan International Film Festival
 Winner The Unforgiven (Yoon Jong-bin, South Korea)
 Hawaii International Film Festival
 Winner Season of the Horse (Ning Cai, Mongolia)
 International Film Festival Rotterdam
 Winner Sanctuary (Ho Yuhang, Malaysia)
 Locarno International Film Festival
 Winner So Much Rice (Li Hongqi, China)
 Winner The Rising - Ballad of Mangal Pandey (Ketan Mehta, India)
 Osian's Cinefan Festival of Asian Cinema
 Winner The Black and White Milk Cow (Jin Yang, China)
 Singapore International Film Festival
 Winner Stray Dogs (Marzieh Meshkini, Iran)
 Tallinn Black Nights Film Festival
 Winner Earth And Ashes (Atiq Rahimi, Afghanistan)
 Venice Film Festival
 Winner 13 Tzameti (Géla Babluani, Georgia)
 Vesoul International Film Festival of Asian Cinema
 Winner Two Great Sheep (Liu Hao, China)

2006
 Berlin International Film Festival
 Winner Dear Pyongyang (Yang Yong-hi, Japan)
 Brisbane International Film Festival
 Winner Blood Rain (Kim Dae-seung, South Korea)
 Busan International Film Festival
 Winner The Last Dining Table (Roh Gyeong-tae, South Korea)
 Hawaii International Film Festival
 Winner 4:30 (Royston Tan, Singapore)
 International Film Festival Rotterdam
 Winner The Lost Hum (Hiromasa Hirosue, Japan)
 Winner The Blossoming of Maximo Oliveros (Auraeus Solito, the Philippines)
 Locarno International Film Festival
 Winner Don't Look Back (Kim Young-Nam, South Korea)
 Winner Bliss (Sheng Zhimin, China)
 Osian's Cinefan Festival of Asian Cinema
 Winner Midnight My Love (Kongdej Jaturanrasamee, Thailand)
 Singapore International Film Festival
 Winner Todo todo teros (John Torres, the Philippines)
 Special Mention Taking Father Home (Ying Liang, China)
 Tallinn Black Nights Film Festival
 Winner Kargaran Mashghoule Karand (Mani Haghighi, Iran)
 Vesoul International Film Festival of Asian Cinema
 Winner Gilane (Rakhshan Bani-Etemad and Mohsen Abdolvahab, Iran)

2007
 Antalya Film Festival
 Winner Yumurta (Semih Kaplanoğlu, Turkey)
 Winner Under the Bombs (Philippe Aractingi, Lebanon)
 Asiatica Film Mediale
 Winner Pure Coolness (Ernest Abdyjaparov, Kyrgyzstan)
 Berlin International Film Festival
 Winner Faces of a Fig Tree (Kaori Momoi, Japan)
 Winner Tuli (Auraeus Solito, Philippines)
 Brisbane International Film Festival
 Winner The Bet Collector (Jeffrey Jeturian, the Philippines)
 Busan International Film Festival
 Winner With the Girl of Black Soil (Jeon Soo-il, South Korea)
 Winner Hello Stranger (Kim Donghyun, South Korea)
 Eurasia International Film Festival
 Winner Swallow (Abai Kulbai, Kazakhstan)
 Hawaii International Film Festival
 Winner Owl and the Sparrow (Stephane Gauger, Vietnam)
 International Film Festival of Kerala
 Winner – Asian Competition Getting Home (Zhang Yang, China)
 Winner – Malayalam Competition Ore Kadal (Shyamaprasad, India)
 International Film Festival Rotterdam
 Winner Fourteen (Hiromasa Hirosue, Japan)
 Special Mention Dancing Bells (Deepak Kumaran Menon, Malaysia)
 Special Mention How Is Your Fish Today? (Xiaolu Guo; China, UK)
 Jeonju International Film Festival
 Winner Summer Heat (Brillante Mendoza, the Philippines)
 Karlovy Vary International Film Festival
 Winner The Band's Visit (Bikur hatizmoret) (Eran Kolirin, Israel)
 Locarno International Film Festival
 Winner Those Three (Naghi Nemati, Iran)
 Osian's Cinefan Festival of Asian and Arab Cinema
 Winner Dancing Bells (Deepak Kumaran Menon, Malaysia)
 Singapore International Film Festival
 Winner Crossing the Dust (Shawkat Amin Korki, Iraq)
 Winner Like A Virgin (Lee Hae-young, Lee Hae-jun; South Korea)
 Taipei Golden Horse Film Festival
 Winner The Unseeable (Wisit Sasanatieng, Thailand)
 Tallinn Black Nights Film Festival
 Winner Mogari No Mori (Naomi Kawase, Japan)
 Vesoul International Film Festival of Asian Cinema
 Winner Kantatar (Bappaditya Bandopadhyay, India)

2008
 Antalya Film Festival
 Winner Sonbahar (Özcan Alper, Turkey)
 Asiatica Film Mediale
 Winner Tokyo Sonata (Kiyoshi Kurosawa, Japan)
 Winner Songs from the Southern Seas (Marat Sarulu, Kazakhstan)
 Berlin International Film Festival
 Winner United Red Army (Kōji Wakamatsu, Japan)
 Special Mention Paruthiveeran (Ameer Sultan, India)
 Brisbane International Film Festival
 Winner Foster Child (Brillante Mendoza, the Philippines)
 Busan International Film Festival
 Winner Members of the Funeral (Baek Seung-bin, South Korea)
 Winner Treeless Mountain (Kim Soyong, South Korea)
 Eurasia International Film Festival
 Winner Together with my Father (Danyar Salamat, Kazakhstan)
 Hawaii International Film Festival
 Winner Brutus, Ang Paglalakbay (Tara Illenberger, the Philippines)
 Karlovy Vary International Film Festival
 Winner Written (Kim Byung-woo, South Korea)
 Winner Tulpan (Sergey Dvortsevoy, Kazakhstan)
 International Film Festival of Kerala
 Winner – Asian Competition My Marlon and Brando (Hüseyin Karabey, Turkey)
 Winner – Malayalam Competition Adayalangal (M.G. Sasi, India)
 International Film Festival Rotterdam
 Winner What on Earth Have I Done Wrong?! (Doze Niu, Taiwan)
 Special Mention Crude Oil (Wang Bing, China)
 Jeonju International Film Festival
 Winner Children of God (Yi Seung-jun, Korea)
 Winner Death in the Land of Enacantos (Lav Diaz, the Philippines)
 Locarno International Film Festival
 Winner Daytime Drinking (Noh Young-seok, South Korea)
 Osian's Cinefan Festival of Asian Cinema
 Winner Bioscope (K. M. Madhusudhanan, India)
 Singapore International Film Festival
 Winner Tirador (Brillante Mendoza, the Philippines)
 Taipei Golden Horse Film Festival
 Winner The Photograph (Nan Triveni Achnas, Indonesia)
 Winner Sellout (Yeo Joon Han, Malaysia)
 Tallinn Black Nights Film Festival
 Winner The Shaft (Zhang Chi, China)
 Vesoul International Film Festival of Asian Cinema
 Winner The Old Barber (Hasi Chaolu, China)
 Special Mention The Red Awn (Cai Shangjun, China)

2009
 Antalya Film Festival
 Winner Thirst (Park Chan-wook, South Korea)
 Asian Film Festival Barcelona
 Winner Claustrophobia (Ivy Ho, Hong Kong)
 Asiatica Film Mediale
 Winner The Gift to Stalin (Rustem Abdrashov, Kazakhstan)
 Winner Jamila and the President  (Ratna Sarumpaet, Indonesia)
 Bangkok International Film Festival
 Winner Independencia (Raya Martin, the Philippines)
 Berlin International Film Festival
 Winner Doctor Ma's Country Clinic (Cong Feng, China)
 Winner The Day After (Lee Suk-Gyung, South Korea)
 Brisbane International Film Festival
 Winner About Elly (Asghar Farhadi, Iran)
 Winner Agrarian Utopia (Uruphong Rakasasad, Thailand)
 Busan International Film Festival
 Winner Paju (Park Chan-ok, South Korea)
 Cinemalaya Philippine Independent Film Festival
 Winner Baseco Bakal Boys (Ralston Jover, the Philippines)
 Cines del Sur
 Winner Flowers of the Sky (Prasanna Vithanage, Sri Lanka)
 Winner Before the Burial (Behnam Behzadi, Iran)
 Hawaii International Film Festival
 Winner Castaway on the Moon (Lee Hae-jun, South Korea)
 International Film Festival of Kerala
 Winner – Asian Competition Jermal (Fishing Platform) (Ravi Bharwani, Indonesia)
 Winner – Malayalam Competition Kerala Cafe (Lal Jose, Shaji Kailas, Revathi, Shyamaprasad, Anwar Rasheed, B. Unnikrishnan, Anjali Menon, M. Padmakumar, Shankar Ramakrishnan, Uday Ananthan; India)
 International Film Festival Rotterdam
 Winner The Land (He Jia, China)
 Jeonju International Film Festival
 Winner Imburnal (Sherad Anthony Sanchez, the Philippines)
 Karlovy Vary International Film Festival
 Winner Breathless (Yang Ik-june, South Korea)
 Locarno International Film Festival
 Winner At the End of Daybreak (Ho Yuhang, Malaysia)
 Winner One Night in Supermarket (Yang Qing, China)
 Osian's Cinefan Festival of Asian and Arab Cinema
 Winner The Long Night (Hatem Ali, Syria)
 Winner Khargosh (Paresh Kamdar, India)
 Singapore International Film Festival
 Winner Jalainur (Zhao Ye, China)
 Taipei Golden Horse Film Festival
 Winner Blind Pig Who Wants to Fly (Edwin, Indonesia)
 Tallinn Black Nights Film Festival
 Winner No One Knows About Persian Cats (Bahman Ghobadi, Iran)
 Third Eye Asian Film Festival
 Winner The Gift to Stalin (Rustem Abdrashov, Kazakhstan)
 Vesoul International Film Festival of Asian Cinema
 Winner Dawn of the World (Abbas Fahdel; Iraq, France)

2010
 Asian Film Festival Barcelona
 Winner Between Two Worlds (Vimukthi Jayasundara, Sri Lanka)
 Asiatica Film Mediale
 Winner Riding the Stallion of Dream  (Girish Kasaravalli, India)
 Winner Single Man (Hao Jie, China)
 Berlin International Film Festival
 Winner Au Revoir Taipei (Arvin Chen, Taiwan)
 Busan International Film Festival
 Winner Dooman River (Zhang Lu, South Korea and France)
 Chongqing Independent Film and Video Festival
 Winner – Feature Film Fortune Teller (Xu Tong, China)
 Winner – Short Film The Unnamed (Huang Yali, Taiwan)
 Cinemalaya Philippine Independent Film Festival
 Winner Sheika (Arnel Mardoquio, the Philippines)
 Cines del Sur
 Winner Adrift (Bui Thac Chuyen; Vietnam, France)
 Didor International Film Festival
 Winner The Other Bank (George Ovashvili, Georgia)
 Hawaii International Film Festival
 Winner Monga (Doze Niu, Taiwan)
 International Film Festival of Kerala
 Winner – Asian Competition I Am Afia Megha Abhimanyu Omar (Onir Anirban, India)
 Winner – Malayalam Competition Veettilekkulla Vazhi (Dr. Biju, India)
 International Film Festival Rotterdam
 Winner Moscow (Whang Cheol-mean, South Korea)
 Jeonju International Film Festival
 Winner Clash (Pepe Diokno, the Philippines)
 Karlovy Vary International Film Festival
 Winner Son of Babylon (Mohamed Al-Daradji, Iraq)
 Winner Orion (Zamani Esmati, Iran)
 Singapore International Film Festival
 Winner The Dreamer (Sang Pemimpi) (Riri Riza, Indonesia)
 Taipei Golden Horse Film Festival
 Winner Mundane History (Anocha Suwichakornpong, Thailand)
 Third Eye Asian Film Festival
 Winner Judge (Liu Jie, China)
 Vesoul International Film Festival of Asian Cinema
 Winner Animal Town (Jeon Kyu-hwan, South Korea)
 Vietnam International Film Festival
 Winner Sandcastle (Boo Junfeng, Singapore)

2011
 Abu Dhabi Film Festival
 Winner Marathon Boy (Gemma Atwal; UK, India)
 Asiatica Film Mediale
 Winner Dokhtar...Pedar...Dokhtar (Panahbarkhoda Rezaee, Iran)
 Busan International Film Festival
 Winner The King of Pigs (Yeon Sang-ho, South Korea)
 Berlin International Film Festival
 Winner Heaven's Story (Takahisa Zeze, Japan)
 Special Mention Ways of the Sea (Sheron Dayoc, the Philippines)
 Chongqing Independent Film and Video Festival
 Winner – Feature Film Old Dog (Pema Tseden, China)
 Winner – Short Film Court Ladies (Shen Chaofang, China)
 Cinemalaya Philippine Independent Film Festival
 Winner Boundary (Benito Bautista, the Philippines)
 Eurasia International Film Festival
 Winner The Lead (Zulfikar Musakov, Uzbekistan)
 Hawaii International Film Festival
 Winner Hanaan (Ruslan Pak, South Korea and Uzbekistan)
 International Film Festival of Kerala
 Winner – Asian Competition At the End of It All (Aditi Roy, India)
 Winner – Malayalam Competition Adaminte Makan Abu (Salim Ahamed, India)
 International Film Festival Rotterdam
 Winner Black Blood (Zhang Miaoyan, China and France)
 Winner The Day I Disappeared (Atousa Bandeh Ghiasabadi, Iran)
 Jeonju International Film Festival
 Winner Single Man (Hao Jie, China)
 Karlovy Vary International Film Festival
 Winner Once Upon a Time in Anatolia (Nuri Bilge Ceylan; Turkey, Bosnia and Herzegovina)
 Kolkata International Film Festival
 Winner Guerrilla (Nasiruddin Yousuff, Bangladesh)
 Taipei Golden Horse Film Festival
 Winner Bunohan (Dain Said, Malaysia)
 Tallinn Black Nights Film Festival
 Winner Mourning (Morteza Farshbaf, Iran)
 Third Eye Asian Film Festival
 Winner Gangor (Italo Spinelli; Italy, India)
 Vesoul International Film Festival of Asian Cinema
 Winner P.S. (Elkin Tuychiev, Uzbekistan)
 Warsaw International Film Festival
 Winner No 89 Shimen Road (Haolun Shu, Hong Kong)

2012
 Abu Dhabi Film Festival
 Winner A World Not Ours (Mahdi Fleifel; Palestine, UK, Lebanon, Denmark and United Arab Emirates)
 Asiatica Film Mediale
 Winner Parviz (Majid Barzegar, Iran)
 Bengaluru International Film Festival
 Winner Epilogue (Amir Manor, Israel)
 Winner Darling, Something's Wrong with Your Head (Susan Youssef, Palestine)
 Berlin International Film Festival
 Winner Modest Reception (Mani Haghighi, Iran)
 Busan International Film Festival
 Winner Jiseul (O Muel, South Korea)
 Cinemalaya Philippine Independent Film Festival
 Winner - Directors Showcase Competition Bwakaw (Jun Lana, the Philippines)
 Winner - New Breed Competition Diablo (Mes de Guzman, the Philippines)
 Eurasia International Film Festival
 Winner Student (Darejan Omirbaev, Kazakhstan)
 Hanoi International Film Festival
 Winner Night of Silence (Reis Çelik, Turkey)
 Hawaii International Film Festival
 Winner Apparition (Isabel Sandoval, credited as Vincent Sandoval, the Philippines)
 International Film Festival of Kerala
 Winner – Asian Competition I. D. (K. D. Kamal, India)
 Winner – Malayalam Competition Ee Adutha Kalathu (Arun Kumar Aravind, India)
 International Film Festival Rotterdam
 Winner Sentimental Animal (Wu Quan, China)
 Jeonju International Film Festival
 Winner Florentina Hubaldo, CTE (Lav Diaz, the Philippines)
 Karlovy Vary International Film Festival
 Winner Beyond the Hill (Emin Alper; Turkey, Greece)
 Kolkata International Film Festival
 Winner 11 Flowers (Wang Xiaoshuai, China)
 Taipei Golden Horse Film Festival
 Winner The Love Songs of Tiedan (Hao Jie, China)
 Toronto International Film Festival
 Winner The Land of Hope (Sion Sono; Japan, United Kingdom and Taiwan)
 Vesoul International Film Festival of Asian Cinema
 Winner August Drizzle (Aruna Jayawardana, Sri Lanka)
 Special Mention Return Ticket (Teng Yung-Shing; Taiwan, China)
 Warsaw International Film Festival
 Winner Kalayaan (Adolfo Alix Jr., the Philippines)

2013
 Abu Dhabi Film Festival
 Winner Harmony Lessons (Emir Baigazin; Kazakhstan, Germany, France)
 Asiatica Film Mediale
 Winner Snow on Pines (Payman Maadi, Iran)
 Berlin International Film Festival
 Winner When I Saw You (Annemarie Jacir; Palestine and Jordan)
 Busan International Film Festival
 Winner Shuttlecock (Lee Yubin, South Korea)
 Cinemalaya Philippine Independent Film Festival
 Winner - Directors Showcase Competition The Bit Player (Jeffrey Jeturian, the Philippines)
 Winner - New Breed Competition Transit (Hannah Espia, the Philippines)
 Eurasia International Film Festival
 Winner The Little Brother (Serik Aprymov, Kazakhstan)
 Winner Waiting for the Sea (Bakhtyar Khudojnazarov, Tadjikistan)
 Hawaii International Film Festival
 Winner Monsoon Shootout (Amit Kumar, India)
 International Film Festival of Kerala
 Winner – Asian Competition Meghe Dhaka Tara (Kamaleshwar Mukherjee, India)
 Winner – Malayalam Competition CR No: 89 (P. P. Sudevan, India)
 International Film Festival Rotterdam
 Winner What They Don't Talk About When They Talk About Love (Mouly Surya, Indonesia)
 Jeonju International Film Festival
 Winner Flashback Memories 3D (Matsue Tetsuaki, Japan)
 Kolkata International Film Festival
 Winner Television (Mostofa Sarwar Farooki, Bangladesh)
 Taipei Golden Horse Film Festival
 Winner Mary Is Happy, Mary Is Happy (Nawapol Thamrongrattanarit, Thailand)
 Pacific Meridian Film Festival
 Winner Ilo Ilo (Anthony Chen, Singapore)
 Tripoli Film Festival
 Winner Shakespeare Must Die (Ing Kanjanavanit, Thailand)
 Winner Liberta (Kan Lume, Singapore)
 Toronto International Film Festival
 Winner Qissa (Anup Singh; India, Germany)
 Vesoul International Film Festival of Asian Cinema
 Winner With You Without You (Prasanna Vithanage, Sri Lanka)
 Warsaw International Film Festival
 Winner Harmony Lessons (Emir Baigazin; Kazakhstan, Germany, France)

2014
 Abu Dhabi Film Festival
 Winner Iraqi Odyssey (Samir, Iraq, Switzerland, Germany and United Arab Emirates)
 Bengaluru International Film Festival
 Winner – Asian Cinema Competition Labour of Love (Aditya Vikram Sengupta, India)
 Winner – Kannada Cinema Competition December-1 (P. Sheshadri, India)
 Berlin International Film Festival
 Winner A Dream of Iron (Kelvin Kyung Kun Park, South Korea)
 Winner Non-Fiction Diary (Jung Yoon-suk, South Korea)
 Bucheon International Fantastic Film Festival
 Winner Wood Job! (Shinobu Yaguchi, Japan)
 Busan International Film Festival
 Winner Socialphobia (Hong Seok-jae, South Korea)
 Cinemalaya Independent Film Festival
 Winner - Directors Showcase Competition Hustisya (Joel Lamangan, the Philippines)
 Winner - New Breed Competition Bwaya (Francis Pasion, the Philippines)
 Eurasia International Film Festival
 Winner Adventure (Nariman Turebayev, Kazakhstan)
 Hanoi International Film Festival
 Winner The Coffin Maker (Jason Paul Laxamana, the Philippines)
 Hawaii International Film Festival
 Winner Titli (Kanu Behl, India)
 International Film Festival of Kerala
 Winner – Asian Competition Summer, Kyoto (Hiroshi Toda, Japan)
 Winner – Malayalam Competition Oraalppokkam (Sanal Kumar Sasidharan, India)
 International Film Festival Rotterdam
 Winner 28 (Prasanna Jayakody, Sri Lanka)
 Jeonju International Film Festival
 Winner Tokyo Family (Yoji Yamada, Japan)
 Jogja-NETPAC Asian Film Festival
 Winner The Naked DJ (Kan Lume, Singapore)
 Taipei Golden Horse Film Festival
 Winner Quick Change (Eduardo W. Roy Jr., the Philippines)
 Pacific Meridian Film Festival
 Winner A Hard Day (Kim Seong-hoon, South Korea)
 QCinema International Film Festival
 Winner – Best Feature Ang Di Paglimot sa Alaala (Carl Joseph Papa, the Philippines)
 Winner –  Best Short Film Ang Nanay ni Justin Barber! (Victor Villanueva, the Philippines)
 Special Mention Senior (Jed Medrano, the Philippines)
 Tallinn Black Nights Film Festival
 Winner The Move (Marat Sarulu, Kyrgyzstan)
 Toronto International Film Festival
 Winner Margarita, with a Straw (Shonali Bose, India)
 Vesoul International Film Festival of Asian Cinema
 Winner The Ferry (Shi Wei, China)
 Warsaw International Film Festival
 Winner 13 (Hooman Seyedi, Iran)

2015
 All Lights India International Film Festival
 Winner Mina Walking (Yosef Baraki, Canada and Afghanistan)
 Busan International Film Festival
 Winner Communication & Lies (Lee Seung-Won, South Korea)
 Busan International Short Film Festival
 Winner Ketchup (Yan Baishen, Guo Chunning; China)
 Cinemalaya Independent Film Festival
 Winner – Short Film Wawa (Angelie Mae Macalanda, the Philippines)
 Eurasia International Film Festival
 Winner Kunanbai (Doskhan Zholzhaksynov, Kazakhstan)
 Hawaii International Film Festival
 Winner The Kids (Sunny Yu, Taiwan)
 International Film Festival of Kerala
 Winner – Asian Competition Yona (Nir Bergman, Israel)
 Winner – Malayalam Competition Ottaal (Jayaraj, India)
 International Film Festival Rotterdam
 Winner Poet on a Business Trip (Ju Anqi, China)
 Jeonju International Film Festival
 Winner Under the Sun (Seulki Ahn, Korea)
 Jogja-NETPAC Asian Film Festival
 Winner Nay (Djenar Maesa Ayu, Indonesia)
 Kolkata International Film Festival
 Winner Blanka (Kohki Hasei; Japan, Italy, Philippines)
 Pacific Meridian Film Festival
 Winner Shadow Behind the Moon (Jun Lana, Philippines)
 Taipei Golden Horse Film Festival
 Winner Kaaka Muttai (M. Manikandan, India)
 Tallinn Black Nights Film Festival
 Winner Stranger (Yeremek Tursunov, Kazakhstan)
 Toronto International Film Festival
 Winner The Whispering Star (Sion Sono, Japan)
 QCinema International Film Festival
 Winner – Circle Competition for Filipino Films Sleepless (Prime Cruz, the Philippines)
 Winner –  DoQC Competition Crescent Rising (Sheron Dayoc, the Philippines)
 Vesoul International Film Festival of Asian Cinema
 Winner The Monk (The Maw Naing, Myanmar)
 Special Mention Chen Shiang-chyi in Exit (Chien Hsiang, Taiwan)
 Yakutsk International Film Festival
 Winner God Johogoi (Sergei Potapov, Russia)

2016
 All Lights India International Film Festival
 Winner Houra (Gholamreza Sagharchian, Iran)
 Bengaluru International Film Festival
 Winner – Asian Cinema Competition Under Heaven (Dalmira Tilepbergen, Kyrgyzstan)
 Winner – Asian Cinema Competition Thithi (Raam Reddy, India)
 Winner – Kannada Cinema Competition Child of Debt (Umashankar Swamy, India)
 Bucheon International Fantastic Film Festival
 Winner The Forest (Paul Spurrier, Thailand)
 Busan International Film Festival
 Winner Merry Christmas Mr. Mo (Lim Dae-hyung, Korea)
 Cinemalaya Independent Film Festival
 Winner – Feature Film Pamilya Ordinaryo (Eduardo Roy, Jr., the Philippines)
 Winner – Short Film Ang Maangas, Ang Marikit, at Ang Makata (Jose Ibarra Guballa, the Philippines)
 Five Flavours Film Festival
 Winner Tharlo (Pema Tseden, China)
 Hanoi International Film Festival
 Winner The Green Carriage (Oleg Asadulin, Russia)
 Hawaii International Film Festival
 Winner Knife in the Clear Water (Wan Xuebo, China)
 International Film Festival of Kerala
 Winner – Asian Competition Cold of Kalandar (Mustafa Kara, Turkey)
 Winner – Malayalam Competition Kammatipaadam (Rajeev Ravi, India)
 International Film Festival Rotterdam
 Winner The Plague at the Karatas Village (Adilkhan Yerzhanov, Kazakhstan)
 Iranian Film Festival Australia
 Winner Life and a Day (Saeed Roostaee, Iran)
 Jeonju International Film Festival
 Winner Spy Nation (Choi Seung-ho, Korea)
 Jogja-Netpac Asian Film Festival
 Winner Turah (Wicaksono Winsu Legowo, Indonesia)
 Kolkata International Film Festival
 Winner Singing in Graveyards (Bradley Liew, Malaysia and the Philippines)
 Winner Lady of the Lake (Haobam Pawan Kumar, India)
 Pacific Meridian Film Festival
 Winner Immortal (Seyed Hadi Mohaghegh, Iran)
 QCinema International Film Festival
 Winner – Circle Competition for Filipino Films Baboy Halas (Bagane Fiola, the Philippines)
 Winner – QCShorts Competition Papa's Shadows (Inshallah Montero, the Philippines)
 Taipei Golden Horse Film Festival
 Winner Apprentice (Boo Junfeng; Singapore, Germany, France, Hong Kong and Qatar)
 Tallinn Black Nights Film Festival
 Winner Duet (David Nanesh, Iran)
 Toronto International Film Festival
 Winner In Between (Maysaloun Hamoud, Israel and France)
 Vesoul International Film Festival of Asian Cinema
 Winner Imbisibol (Lawrence Fajardo, the Philippines)
 Special Mention Wednesday, May 9 (Vahid Jalilvand, Iran)
 Warsaw International Film Festival
 Winner Blessed Benefit (Mahmoud al Massad; Jordan, Germany, Netherlands and Qatar)

2017
 Asian Film Festival Barcelona
 Winner Diamond Island (Davy Chou; Cambodia, France, Germany, Thailand, Qatar)
 Special Mention Children of Genghis (Zolbayar Dorj, Mongolia)
 Bengaluru International Film Festival
 Winner – Kannada Cinema Competition Uppina Kagada (B. Suresha, India)
 Bucheon International Fantastic Film Festival
 Winner The Village of No Return (Chen Yu-hsun; Taiwan, China)
 Busan International Film Festival
 Winner February (Kim Joonghyun, South Korea)
 Cinemalaya Philippine Independent Film Festival
 Winner – Feature Film Respeto (Alberto Monteras II, the Philippines)
 Winner – Short Film Aliens Ata (Glenn Barit, the Philippines)
 Eurasia International Film Festival
 Winner Centaur (Aktan Arym Kubat, Kazakhstan)
 Fajr International Film Festival
 Winner The Home (Asghar Yousefinejad, Iran)
 Hawaii International Film Festival
 Winner One Thousand Ropes (Tusi Tamasese, New Zealand)
 International Film Festival & Awards Macao
 Winner Angels Wear White (Vivian Qu, Taiwan)
 International Film Festival of Kerala
 Winner – Asian Competition Newton (Amit V Masurkar, India)
 Winner – Malayalam Competition Thondimuthalum Driksakshiyum (Dileesh Pothan, India)
 International Film Festival Rotterdam
 Winner Children are not Afraid of Death, Children are Afraid of Ghosts (Rong Guang Rong, China)
 Jeonju International Film Festival
 Winner The Painter's View (Kim Heecheol, South Korea)
 Moscow International Film Festival
 Winner Ordinary Person (Kim Bong-han, South Korea)
 Pacific Meridian Film Festival
 Winner Nearest and Dearest (Ksenia Zueva, Russia)
 QCinema International Film Festival
 Winner – Circle Competition for Filipino Films The Ashes and Ghost of Tayug 1931 (Christopher Gozum, the Philippines)
 Winner – Asian Next Wave Competition Snow Woman (Kiki Sugino, Japan)
 Winner – RainbowQC Competition Beach Rats (Eliza Hittman, USA)
 Winner – QCShorts Competition Gikan Sa Ngitngit Nga Kinailadman (Kiri Dalena, the Philippines)
 Taipei Golden Horse Film Festival
 Winner Malila: The Farewell Flower (Anucha Boonyawatana, Thailand)
 Tallinn Black Nights Film Festival
 Winner Goodbye, Grandpa! (Yukihiro Morigaki, Japan)
 Toronto International Film Festival
 Winner The Great Buddha+ (Huang Hsin-yao, Taiwan)
 Vesoul International Film Festival of Asian Cinema
 Winner Going the Distance (Harumoto Yujiro, Japan)
 Warsaw International Film Festival
 Winner Out of Frame (Wai Lun Kwok, China)

2018
 Asian Film Festival Barcelona
 Winner A Tiger in Winter (Lee Kwang-kuk, South Korea)

 Bengaluru International Film Festival
 Winner – Asian Cinema Competition Excavator (Lee Ju-hyoung, South Korea)
 Winner – Kannada Cinema Competition Beti (Daughter) (P. Sheshadri, India)

 Bucheon International Fantastic Film Festival
 Winner The Hungry Lion (Takaomi Ogata, Japan)
 Winner I'm Crazy (Masaaki Kudo, Japan)

 Busan International Film Festival
 Winner House of Hummingbird (Kim Bora, South Korea)
 Cinemalaya Philippine Independent Film Festival
 Winner – Feature Film Kung Paano Hinihintay Ang Dapithapon (Carlo Enciso Catu, the Philippines)
 Winner – Short Film Sa Saiyang Isla (Christian Candelaria, the Philippines)
 Fajr International Film Festival
 Winner Hendi & Hormoz (Abbas Amini; Iran, Czech Republic)
 Hanoi International Film Festival
 Winner Student A (Lee Kyung-sup, South Korea)
 Hawaii International Film Festival
 Winner Still Human (Oliver Siu Kuen Chan, Hong Kong)
 International Film Festival & Awards Macao
 Winner Suburban Birds (Qiu Sheng, China)
 International Film Festival of Kerala
 Winner Ee.Ma.Yau (Lijo Jose Pellissery, India)
 International Film Festival Rotterdam
 Winner Nervous Translation (Shireen Seno, the Philippines)
 Jeonju International Film Festival
 Winner Adulthood (Kim Inseon, South Korea)
 Jogja-NETPAC Asian Film Festival
 Winner The Song of Grassroots (Yuda Kurniawan, Indonesia)
 Kathmandu International Mountain Film Festival
 Winner Trembling Mountain (Kesang Tseten Lama, Nepal)
 Kolkata International Film Festival
 Winner The Sweet Requiem (Ritu Sarin & Tenzing Sonam; India)
 Moscow International Film Festival
 Winner China's Van Goghs (Yu Haibo & Yu Tianqi Kiki; China, the Netherlands)
 Pacific Meridian Film Festival
 Winner An Elephant Sitting Still (Hu Bo, China)
 QCinema International Film Festival
 Winner – Circle Competition for Filipino Films Dog Days (Timmy Harn, the Philippines)
 Shaken Aimanov International Film Festival
 Winner The Secret of a Leader (Farkhat Sharipov, Kazakhstan)
 Taipei Golden Horse Film Festival
 Winner With All My Hypothalamus (Dwein Baltazar, the Philippines)
 Tallinn Black Nights Film Festival
 Winner Kejal (Nima Salehiyar, Iran)
 Toronto International Film Festival
 Winner The Third Wife (Ash Mayfair, Vietnam)
 Special Mention The Crossing (Bai Xue, China)
 Ulju Mountain Film Festival
 Winner Trembling Mountain (Kesang Tseten Lama, Nepal)
 Vesoul International Film Festival of Asian Cinema
 Winner The Taste of Rice Flower (Pengfei, China)
 Winner Mothers (Lee Dong-eun, South Korea)
 Special Mention A Letter to the President (Roya Sadat, Afghanistan)
 Warsaw International Film Festival
 Winner The Fall (Zhou Lidong, China)

2019
 Asiatica Film Mediale
 Winner Flavours of Flesh (Biriyaani) (Sajin Babu, India)
 Bengaluru International Film Festival
 Winner – Asian Cinema Competition Sivaranjini and other Women (Vasanth, India)
 Winner – Kannada Cinema Competition Nathicharami (Mansore, India)
 Bucheon International Fantastic Film Festival
 Winner Gully Boy (Zoya Akhtar, India)
 Busan International Film Festival
 Winner Moving On (Yoon Danbi, South Korea)
 Cinemalaya Philippine Independent Film Festival
 Winner – Feature Film John Denver Trending (Arden Rod Condez, the Philippines)
 Winner – Short Film Disconnection Notice (Glenn Averia, the Philippines)
 Special Mention – Short Film Sa Among Agwat (Don Senoc, the Philippines)
 El Gouna Film Festival
 Winner Kabul, City in the Wind (Aboozar Amini; Afghanistan, Netherlands, Japan, Germany)
 Eurasia International Film Festival
 Winner Beanpole (Kantemir Balagov, Russia)
 Fajr International Film Festival
 Winner The Narrow Red Line (Farzad Khoshdast, Iran)
 Hainan International Film Festival
 Winner Verdict (Raymund Ribay Gutierrez, the Philippines)
 Hawaii International Film Festival
 Winner Another Child (Kim Yoon-seok, South Korea)
 International Film Festival of Kerala
 Winner – Asian Competition Aani Maani (Fahim Irshad, India)
 Winner – Malayalam Competition Tress Under the Sun (Dr. Biju, India)
 Special Mention – Malayalam Competition Kumbalangi Nights (Madhu C Narayanan, India)
 International Film Festival and Awards Macao
 Winner To Live to Sing (Johnny Ma, China)
 International Film Festival Rotterdam
 Winner Last Night I Saw You Smiling (Kavich Neang; Cambodia, France)
 International Short and Independent Film Festival Dhaka
 Winner Fish Musing (Suborna Senjutee Tushee; India, Bangladesh)
 Jeonju International Film Festival
 Winner The Harvest (Misho Antadze, Georgia)
 Jogja-NETPAC Asian Film Festival
 Winner Aurora (Bekzat Pirmatov, Kyrgyzstan)
 Winner Nakorn-Sawan (Puangsoi Aksornsawang, Thailand)
 Kolkata International Film Festival
 Winner Devi Aur Hero (Aditya Kripalani, India)
 Moscow International Film Festival
 Winner The Sun Above Me Never Sets (Lyubov Borisova, Russia)
 Pacific Meridian Film Festival
 Winner Great Poetry (Alexander Lungin, Russia)
 QCinema International Film Festival
 Winner – Asian Next Wave Competition Suburban Birds (Qiu Sheng, China)
 Taipei Golden Horse Film Festival
 Winner My Prince Edward (Wong Yee-lam, Hong Kong)
 Tallinn Black Nights Film Festival
 Winner Golden Voices (Evgeny Ruman, Israel)
 Toronto International Film Festival
 Winner 1982 (Oualid Mouaness; Lebanon, USA, Qatar, Norway)
 Ulju Mountain Film Festival
 Winner Beloved (Yaser Talebi, Iran)
 Vesoul International Film Festival of Asian Cinema
 Winner A Family Tour (Ying Liang; Hong Kong, Taiwan, Singapore, Malaysia)
 Warsaw Film Festival
 Winner Move the Grave (Seung-o Jeong, South Korea)

2020
 Asian Film Festival Barcelona
 Winner A Dark, Dark Man (Adilkhan Yerzhanov, Kazakhstan)
 Asiatica Film Mediale
 Winner No Choice (Reza Dormishian, Iran)
 Bengaluru International Film Festival
 Winner Happy Old Year (Nawapol Thamrongrattanarit, Thailand)
 Bucheon International Fantastic Film Festival
 Winner I WeirDo (Liao Mingyi, Taiwan)
 Busan International Film Festival
 Winner Fighter (Jero Yun, South Korea)
 Busan International Short Film Festival
 Winner Adam (Shoki Lin, Singapore)
 Winner Tiger and Ox (Kim Seunghee, South Korea)
 Cinemalaya Philippine Independent Film Festival
 Winner – Short Film Tokwifi (Carla Pulido Ocampo, the Philippines)
 El Gouna Film Festival
 Winner In Between Dying (Hilal Baydarov; Azerbaijan, Mexico, United States)
 International Film Festival Rotterdam
 Winner Nasir (Arun Karthick; India, Netherlands, Singapore)
 Jeonju International Film Festival
 Winner The Shepherdess and the Seven Songs (Pushpendra Singh, India)
 Pacific Meridian Film Festival
 Winner In Deep Sleep (Maria Ignatenko, Russia)
 Taipei Golden Horse Film Festival
 Winner The Story of Southern Islet (Chong Keat Aun, Malaysia)
 Tallinn Black Nights Film Festival
 Winner Ulbolsyn (Adilkhan Yerzhanov, Kazakhstan)
 Toronto International Film Festival
 Winner Gaza mon amour (Tarzan Nasser & Arab Nasser; Palestine, France, Germany, Portugal, Qatar)
 Ulju Mountain Film Festival
 Winner Lunana: A Yak in the Classroom (Pawo Choyning Dorji, Bhutan)
 Vesoul International Film Festival of Asian Cinema
 Winner Saturday Afternoon (Mostofa Sarwar Farooki, Bangladesh)
 Warsaw Film Festival
 Winner The Asadas (Ryota Nakano, Japan)

2021
 Asian Film Festival Barcelona
 Winner Eternally Younger Than Those Idiots (Ryuhei Yoshino, Japan)
 Special Mention Cafe by the Highway (Shi Xiaofan, China)

 Bucheon International Fantastic Film Festival
 Winner Beyond The Infinite Two Minutes (Yamaguchi Junta, Japan)

 Busan International Short Film Festival
 Winner Georgia (Jayil Pak; South Korea, USA)

 Cinemalaya Philippine Independent Film Festival
 Winner – Short Film The Little Planet (Arjanmar H. Rebeta, the Philippines)

 El Gouna Film Festival
 Winner Captain Volkonogov Escaped (Aleksey Chupov & Natasha Merkulova; Russia, Estonia, France)
 Special Mention Once Upon a Time in Calcutta (Aditya Vikram Sengupta; India, France, Norway)

 Fajr International Film Festival
 Winner Major (Ehsan Abdipour, Iran)

 Hawaii International Film Festival
 Winner Anima (Cao Jinling , China)

 International Film Festival of Kerala
 Winner – Malayalam Competition Musical Chair (Vipin Atley, India)

 Jeonju International Film Festival
 Winner Jazz Kissa Basie (Hoshino Tetsuya, Japan)

 Kolkata International Film Festival
 Winner The Salt In Our Waters (Rezwan Shahriar Sumit; Bangladesh, France)

 Moscow International Film Festival
 Winner Mosul my Home (Adalet R. Garmiany, Iraq)

 QCinema International Film Festival
 Winner – QCShorts Competition Skylab (Chuck Escasa, the Philippines)

 Taipei Golden Horse Film Festival
 Winner May You Stay Forever Young (Rex Ren & Lam Sam, Hong Kong)

 Toronto International Film Festival
 Winner Costa Brava, Lebanon (Mounia Akl; Lebanon, France, Qatar, Spain, Sweden, Denmark, Norway, United States)

 Ulju Mountain Film Festival
 Winner Bandar Band (Manijeh Hekmat, Iran)

 Warsaw Film Festival
 Winner Cinema Sabaya (Orit Fokus Rotem, Israel)
 Special Mention YT (Stepan Burnashev & Dmitrii Davydov, Russia)

2022
 Bucheon International Fantastic Film Festival
 Winner Office Royale (Seki Kazuaki, Japan)

 Busan International Film Festival
 Winner A Wild Roomer (Lee Jeong-hong, South Korea)

 Busan International Short Film Festival
 Winner The Boys Club (Chen Yih Wen, Malaysia)

 Cinemalaya Philippine Independent Film Festival
 Winner – Feature Film 12 Weeks (Anna Isabelle Matutina, the Philippines)
 Winner – Short Film Black Rainbow (Zig Madamba Dulay; the Philippines, United States)

 Eurasia International Film Festival
 Winner Fire (Aizhan Kasymbek, Kazakhstan)

 Golden Horse Film Festival
 Winner Autobiography (Makbul Mubarak; Indonesia, France, Germany, Poland, Singapore, Philippines, Qatar)

 Hanoi International Film Festival
 Winner Bone Marrow (Hamid Reza Ghorbani, Iran)
 Winner The Villain Kontrabida (Adolfo Alix Jr., Philippines)

 International Film Festival of Kerala
 Winner – Asian Competition Alam (Firas Khoury; France, Tunisia, Palestine, Saudi Arabia, Qatar)
 Winner – Malayalam Competition Ariyippu (Mahesh Narayanan, India)

 Jogja-NETPAC Asian Film Festival
 Winner Let Me Hear It Barefoot (Riho Kudo, Japan)

 Kazan International Festival of Muslim Cinema
 Winner Silent Glory (Nahid Hassanzadeh, Iran)

 Kolkata International Film Festival
 Winner Manikbabur Megh (Abhinandan Banerjee, India)
 Winner Dov (Muhiddin Muzaffar, Tajikistan)

 Moscow International Film Festival
 Winner Adim (Juboraj Shamim; Bangladesh, Netherlands)

 QCinema International Film Festival
 Winner – Asian Next Wave Competition Return to Seoul (Davy Chou; France, Belgium, Germany, Cambodia)
 Winner – QCShorts Competition Luzonensis osteoporosis (Glenn Barit, the Philippines)

 Toronto International Film Festival
 Winner Sweet As (Jub Clerc, Australia)

 Ulju Mountain Film Festival
 Winner – Short Film Without You (Park Jae-hyun, South Korea)

 Vesoul International Film Festival of Asian Cinema
 Winner Aloners (Hong Sung-eun, South Korea)

 Warsaw Film Festival
 Winner Ademoka's Education (Adilkhan Yerzhanov, Kazakhstan)

See also
Central Asian and Southern Caucasus Film Festivals Confederation
Osian's Cinefan Festival of Asian & Arab Cinema
Toronto International Film Festival NETPAC Prize

References

External links
Official website

Awards established in 1990
Organizations established in 1990
1990 establishments in India
International organisations based in Singapore
Asian film awards
Indian film awards